The Tremellodendropsidales are an order of fungi in the class Agaricomycetes. The order currently comprises a single family containing a small group of clavarioid fungi with partly septate basidia. The order was established as a result of molecular research, based on cladistic analysis of DNA sequences.

References

Agaricomycetes
Basidiomycota orders